The Blitzkrieg series is a collection of real-time tactics (RTT) computer games set in World War II.

Gameplay
Similar to the Sudden Strike games, Blitzkrieg focuses on battles rather than real-time strategy aspects like base building.

Multiplayer
Each Blitzkrieg game has included the ability to play multiplayer games against other humans, with the latest entry in the series Blitzkrieg 3 implementing massively multiplayer online real-time strategy game elements.

Games

Blitzkrieg

Blitzkrieg is a real-time tactics computer game based on the events of World War II. The game allows players to assume the role of commanding officer during the battles of World War II that occurred in Europe and North Africa.

Blitzkrieg 2

Blitzkrieg 2 is an evolution of its predecessor Blitzkrieg. The game takes place in Africa, Russia, the Pacific and Europe, and features the 6 different factions portrayed in the game that fought in their battle respective grounds during the war.

Blitzkrieg 3

Blitzkrieg 3 is an in-development Massively multiplayer online real-time strategy game computer game based on the events of World War II and is the sequel to Blitzkrieg 2.

See also 

 Stalingrad (2005 video game), a related game using Nival's Enigma Engine

References

Enigma Engine games
Lua (programming language)-scripted video games
MacOS games
Real-time tactics video games
Real-time strategy video games
Video game franchises introduced in 2003
Video games developed in Russia
Video games with expansion packs
Video games with isometric graphics
Windows games
World War II video games